Habil Aliyev (28 May 1927 – 8 September 2015) was a prominent Azerbaijani kamancheh player. His music is widely appreciated in the Middle East and Europe.

Musical career
Habil Aliyev's first international performance was in United Kingdom when he was accompanying Rashid Behbudov and Tamara Sinyavskaya. This performances created great resonance and British press quoting Major of Glasgow called Aliyev "Paganini of Azerbaijan". He inspired Israeli musician Mark Eliyahu to play kamancheh.

In 2009, suffering from poor health, he made a symbolic "last concert" at Tehran Roudaki-Wahdat concert hall.

Influence and legacy
In 2014, child music school in Agdash named after him. He died in 2015 at the age of 88.

References

1927 births
2015 deaths
Deaths in Azerbaijan
Recipients of the Istiglal Order
People from Agdash District
Azerbaijani musicians
Mugham musicians
20th-century Azerbaijani musicians